Jamkhansiam Siam Hanghal (born 26 May 1993) is an Indian professional footballer who plays as a midfielder for Madan Maharaj.

Career

Early career and Bengaluru FC
Born in Churachandpur, Manipur, Hanghal began his football career at the Tata Football Academy before beginning his professional career in the I-League with Pailan Arrows. After not gaining much playing time during the 2012–13 season, Hanghal was loaned to I-League 2nd Division side DSK Shivajians. After the season, Hanghal signed with newly established Bengaluru FC for the 2013–14 I-League campaign. He made his professional debut for the club on 22 September 2013 in Bengaluru FC's first ever match against Mohun Bagan. He started the match and played the full ninety as Bengaluru FC drew 1–1. He then scored his first professional goal for the club on 23 October 2013 against Dempo. His sixth minute strike was the first in a 3–1 victory. During his three year spell with Bengaluru FC, Hanghal won two I-League titles and a Federation Cup.

NorthEast United (loan)
On 10 July 2015 it was announced that Hanghal had been drafted by NorthEast United for the 2015 Indian Super League season. He made his debut for the team on 6 October 2015 against the Kerala Blasters. He started the match and played the whole 90 minutes as NorthEast United lost 3–1.

Chennaiyin
On 2 August 2016 Hanghal signed with Chennaiyin for the 2016 ISL season. He made his debut for the side on 2 October 2016 against Atlético de Kolkata in Chennaiyin's opening match. He came on as a 90th minute substitute for Baljit Sahni as Chennaiyin drew the match 2–2. Hanghal then earned his first start for the team on 20 October against his former side, NorthEast United. His cross was converted into the net by Davide Succi as Chennaiyin came out 1–0 winners. Hanghal also earned the Emerging Player of the Match award for his performance.

Kerala Blasters
After a short stint with Mumbai in the I-League, Hanghal was selected in the 9th round of the 2017–18 ISL Players Draft by the Kerala Blasters for the 2017–18 Indian Super League season on 23 July 2017. He made his debut for the club on 3 December 2017 in their match against Mumbai City. He came on as a 65th minute substitute for Jackichand Singh as Kerala Blasters drew 1–1.

Delhi Dynamos
After one season with the Kerala Blasters, Hanghal signed with another ISL club, Delhi Dynamos on 11 June 2018.

Neroca FC
Neroca signed Hanghal for the upcoming I-league 2019-20 season.

International
Hanghal has represented India at the under-23 level, including during the 2014 Asian Games.

Career statistics

Honours

Club
Bengaluru FC
I-League: 2013–14, 2015–16
Federation Cup: 2014–15

References

External links 
 Indian Super League Profile.

1993 births
Living people
People from Churachandpur district
Indian footballers
Indian Arrows players
DSK Shivajians FC players
Bengaluru FC players
NorthEast United FC players
Chennaiyin FC players
Mumbai FC players
Kerala Blasters FC players
Odisha FC players
NEROCA FC players
East Bengal Club players
Association football midfielders
Footballers from Manipur
I-League 2nd Division players
I-League players
Indian Super League players
India youth international footballers
Footballers at the 2014 Asian Games
Asian Games competitors for India